The 2014 W-League grand final took place at Lakeside Stadium in Melbourne, Australia on 23 February 2014.
It was the final match in the W-League 2013–14 season, and was played between third-placed Melbourne Victory and fourth-placed Brisbane Roar. Melbourne Victory won the match 2–0 thanks to goals by Lisa De Vanna and guest player Lauren Barnes.

Match details

Match statistics

See also
List of W-League champions

References

External links

Grand final
Soccer in Melbourne
A-League Women Grand Finals